Al-Shir is a town in northwestern Syria, administratively part of the Latakia Governorate, located south of Latakia. Nearby localities include Baksa and Sqoubin to the north, Fideo to the east and Hanadi, al-Bassah and Bustan al-Basha to the south. According to the Syria Central Bureau of Statistics, al-Shir had a population of 2,129 in the 2004 census. Its inhabitants are predominantly Alawites.

References

Populated places in Latakia District
Alawite communities in Syria